The Wayside Chapel is a charity and parish mission of the Uniting Church in Australia in the Potts Point area of Sydney, Australia. Situated near Sydney's most prominent red-light district in Kings Cross, the Wayside Chapel offers programs and services which attempt to ensure access to health, welfare, social and recreation services. The centre assists homeless people and others on the margins of society.

Description 
The Wayside Chapel's mission is described as "creating a community with no 'us' and 'them'". Its motto, developed during the leadership of the Rev. Graham Long is "Love Over Hate".

Graham Long described the Wayside Chapel's approach in a 2014 interview as not having "any interest at all in solving problems". Rather, the Wayside Chapel characterises its approach in the following way:"I don’t want you to be a problem that I have to fix. I want you to be a person that I can meet. And I think if we meet you’ll change and so will I. You’ll move towards health and so will I. That’s how it works."

History
The Wayside Chapel was established in the Kings Cross area of Sydney in 1964. Ted Noffs was the founder of the Wayside Chapel, which was at the time a Methodist ministry (Uniting Church from 1977). At that time, it was only a single room with a dozen chairs in a block of flats at 29 Hughes Street, Potts Point. Within twelve months of his arrival, Noffs had transformed it into a chapel, coffee shop drop-in and community resource centre. The expectations of the church hierarchy—that Noffs's experiment would fail and become obscure and irrelevant—were not realised.

The centre grew until it occupied the entire building at No. 29. Later it grew still further and occupied the block of flats adjacent to the first block. A crisis centre was established in 1971 to handle crises which might arise at any time of day or night, including drug overdoses and possible suicides. More conventional church activities such as weddings were also carried out and the Wayside Chapel became one of the most popular wedding venues in Sydney, along with St Mark's at Darling Point.

In the late 1990s, Pastor Ray Richmond and others established a "tolerance room" where people who inject drugs were able to do so in a supervised environment, as an act of civil disobedience.  This eventually led to the creation of the legal Medically Supervised Injecting Centre in Kings Cross.

From 2004-2017 the pastor of Wayside Chapel was Graham Long.<

The current pastor and CEO of Wayside Chapel is Jon Owen, who has served in the position since July 2018.

New building 
In July 2009, the Wayside Chapel received a grant of $2 million from the state government for the purpose of rebuilding its physical facilities. An additional grant from the federal government for $3 million was received in late 2009. The balance of funds were raised by private donation. Graham Long said that rainwater had been penetrating the brick walls and causing bricks to fall out. Forty per cent of the existing buildings had already been condemned, but moves were afoot to start a renovation and rebuilding worth $7.5 million.

On 19 May 2012 Wayside held the grand opening of its newly redeveloped building, designed by Environa Studio, the product of an  investment, five years of fundraising and 22 months of construction. The purpose-built facility features a community service centre, café, dedicated program space for The Aboriginal Project and Day-to-Day Living (a program for people with long-term mental health issues), community hall, offices and meeting spaces for groups such as Alcoholics Anonymous. The new building also includes a rooftop garden with over 50 varieties of vegetables, fruit, flowers and herbs, along with a bee hive, worm farm and compost.

Service development 
Ted Noffs intended the Wayside Chapel to be a place where action came before preaching and engagement with the community was more important than going to church on Sunday. Successive ministers have endeavored to uphold this tradition. Noffs pioneered a number of far-reaching and innovative developments in social welfare at The Wayside Chapel:
 The Crisis Centre
 The Drug Referral Center 
 Shepherd of the Streets (SOTS)
 Life Education Centre
 Relatives Against Intake of Narcotics (REIN)

Raymond Richmond was responsible for:
 Hands-On Health Centre (initiated by chiropractors in 1992, later closed down)
 Supervised Injecting Room

Graham Long attempted to develop the mission of "creating community with no 'us and them'". He described his approach as telling people they are not problems to be solved but rather people to be met. Under Long's leadership the following programs have been implemented:
 Aboriginal Project
 Day to Day Living Program (for people living with long-term and persistent mental health issues)
 Wayside Youth
 Community Development

Current programs and services
 Community Service Centre: The CSC is the first point of contact for visitors and provides showers, clothing and emergency food for the most disadvantaged members of the community. The centre also helps those at their lowest ebb transition to better health and a better life through housing support, referrals to drug and alcohol rehabilitation and steps to manage mental health issues.
 Aboriginal Project: Providing a space for specialised, culturally sensitive support, The Aboriginal Project provides opportunities for community members to reconnect with their culture. The project also creates opportunities for leadership, mentoring and positive life choices for those visitors to Wayside who identify as Aboriginal or Torres Strait Islander.
 Wayside Youth: Supporting young people who are at risk, living on or around the streets of Kings Cross, Wayside Youth provides support through a drop in center and street based youth work. The center offers a safe, home environment where young people can come and access laundry and shower facilities. With lounge room, kitchen and activity areas, each area of the program aims to engage and motivate young people as well as provide living skills.
 Day to Day Living: Day to Day living is a structured activity program for people experiencing long term and persistent mental health issues. It aims to support people experiencing social isolation and to improve their independence in the community by teaching social skills, developing social networks and promoting confidence.
 Community Development: Leveraging the purpose-built spaces in the new building, the Community Development Program is dedicated to creating opportunities for all members of the community to come together for activities and events that will help reduce social isolation and promote togetherness.
 Wayside Cafe: The Wayside Café provides low-cost meals and beverages in a relaxed environment. The Café is the busiest and most liveliest part of Wayside, with people from all walks of life coming together for a meal, a coffee or simply to spend time in a safe place where they’re welcome just ‘to be’. While the Café's meals are not free, they are extremely affordable. This is consistent with the greater Wayside mentality of a hand up rather than a handout.
 Wayside Op Shop: Packed to the rafters with clothes, jewellery and homewares, the Op Shop is a favourite of people looking for quirky one-offs and affordable designs. In September 2020, Wayside launched Wayside Online Op Shop opening up its retail bricks and mortar via a digital platform for the social enterprise.

References

External links
 Wayside Chapel Site
 Ted Noffs Foundation site

Uniting Church in Australia
Sydney localities
Homelessness organizations
Kings Cross, New South Wales